Alexandru Guzun (born 29 September 1966) is a Moldovan FIFA player agents, football manager and former footballer who played as defender or midfielder.

During his career, Guzun played for several clubs from Moldova, Romania and Ukraine. He played in European cups for Niva, Rapid București and Tiligul Tiraspol. With Rapid, Guzun also played against Inter Milano on San Siro.

Alexandru Guzun also played 22 matches for the Moldova national football team, scoring 1 goal, against Germany in a 1–3 loss, on 14 October 2000, in Chișinău.

In 2001 Guzun returned as manager, and in 2004 returned as a FIFA player agent. In 2009 Alexandru Guzun was a candidate for the Moldovan Football Federation presidency, losing to Pavel Cebanu, who was elected for the fourth time as president.

International goals

References

External links
 
 
 
 
 
 
 

1966 births
Living people
Moldovan footballers
Moldova international footballers
Moldovan football managers
Moldovan expatriate sportspeople in Ukraine
Association football defenders
Association football midfielders
People from Criuleni District
FC Dnipro players
FC Rapid București players
FC Nistru Otaci players
FC Tighina players